The 2005–06 season was the 91st in the history of the Isthmian League, which is an English football competition featuring semi-professional and amateur clubs from London, East and South East England.

It was the last season in which the Isthmian League consisted of three tiers. At the end of the season Division Two was disbanded, and most of the Division Two clubs were distributed between lower level leagues, while Division One was divided into Division One North and Division One South.

Premier Division

The Premier Division consisted of 22 clubs, including 14 clubs from the previous season and eight new clubs.

 Two clubs relegated from the Conference South:
 Margate
 Redbridge
 Three clubs promoted from Division One:
 AFC Wimbledon
 Bromley
 Walton & Hersham
 Three clubs promoted from Southern Football League Division One East:
 Fisher Athletic
 East Thurrock United
 Maldon Town

Braintree Town won the division and were promoted to the Conference South along with play-off winners Fisher Athletic, who earned a second consecutive promotion. Maldon Town, Windsor & Eton and Redbridge were relegated, while Hendon were initially relegated too as the worst 19th-placed club among the seventh level leagues, but were reprieved after Canvey Island resigned from the Conference.

League table

Top scorers

Play-offs

Stadia and locations

1.Chelmsford City spent start of the season groundsharing with Billericay Town before returning to Chelmsford at January.

Division One

The 2005–06 season was the last of two seasons in which the Isthmian League consisted of a single Division One.

Division One consisted of 23 clubs, including 17 clubs from the previous season and six new clubs:
 Dover Athletic, relegated from the Premier Division
 Kingstonian, relegated from the Premier Division
 Lymington & New Milton, promoted as champions of the Wessex League
 Ramsgate, promoted as champions of the Kent League
 Tonbridge Angels, relegated from the Premier Division
 Walton Casuals, promoted as champions of the Combined Counties League

Ramsgate won the division and were promoted to the Premier Division along with runners-up Horsham, and play-off winners Tonbridge Angels who returned to the Premier Division at the first attempt. There was no relegation from the division this season, though Banstead Athletic resigned from the league at the end of the season.

At the end of the season Division One North and Division One South were created to replace Division One. Most of the clubs remaining in the division were transferred to the new Division One South.

League table

Top scorers

Play-offs

Stadia and locations

Division Two

The 2005–06 season was the last Isthmian League Division Two season. Division Two consisted of 16 clubs, including 13 clubs from the previous season and three new clubs:
 Croydon, relegated from Division One
 Dorking, relegated from Division One
 Egham Town, relegated from Southern Football League Western Division

The four top clubs were promoted: Ware, Witham Town and Flackwell Heath moved to Division One North, while Brook House were transferred to the Southern League. Following this season, clubs remaining in the division were distributed between local ninth tier leagues. Clapton, who were one of the league founder members, were transferred to the Essex Senior League losing their place in the Isthmian League after 101 years.

League table

Stadia and locations

League Cup

The Isthmian League Cup 2005–06 was the 32nd season of the Isthmian League Cup, the league cup competition of the Isthmian League. Sixty-one clubs took part. The competition commenced on 6 September 2005 and finished on 12 April 2006.

Calendar

Fixtures and results
Fixtures are listed in alphabetical order, not that which they were drawn in.

First round
In the First round, the thirty-eight lowest ranked clubs in the Isthmian League played each other for a place in the Second round.

Second round
The nineteen clubs to have made it through the First round were entered into the Second round draw with Cray Wanderers, making twenty teams.

Third round
The ten clubs to have made it through the Second round were entered into the Third round draw with the twenty-two Premier Division clubs, making thirty-two teams.

Fourth round

Quarterfinals

Semifinals
The Semifinals fixtures were played over two legs.

Final

See also
Isthmian League
2005–06 Northern Premier League
2005–06 Southern Football League

References

External links
Official website

Isthmian League seasons
7